The Colonel Reeves Stakes is a Perth Racing Group 3  Thoroughbred horse race held under quality handicap conditions, for horses aged three years old and upwards, over a distance of 1100 metres at Ascot Racecourse, Perth, Western Australia in November.  Prize money is A$150,000.

History
 The race is named in honour of Colonel Reeves, who convened the first meeting of The Western Australian Turf Club on 22 October 1852. 
 In 2003 the race was run at Belmont Park Racecourse.

Grade
1987–2004 - Listed race
2005 onwards - Group 3

Distance
1987–2008 – 1200 metres
2009 onwards - 1100 metres

Name
 2001–2002 - Channel Nine Stakes

Winners

 2021 - Elite Street
 2020 - Celebrity Queen
 2019 - Flirtini
 2018 - Durendal
 2017 - State Solicitor
 2016 - Vega Magic
 2015 - Rock Magic
 2014 - Shining Knight
 2013 - The Rising
 2012 - Barakey
 2011 - Avante
 2010 - Ma Ma Machine
 2009 - Revolition
 2008 - Danny Beau
 2007 - So Secret
 2006 - Electric General
 2005 - Ellicorsam    
  2004 - Avenida Madero    
  2003 - Golden Delicious    
  2002 - Secret Remedy    
  2001 - Lady Belvedere
  2000 - Highwood
  1999 - † Zedavite / Terwilliger
  1998 - Scouts Honour
  1997 - On A Swing
  1996 - Legerman
  1995 - race not held
  1994 - ‡ Tolo Harbour (December)
  1994 - ‡ Sheer Grey (January)
  1993 - race not held
  1992 - Business Beat
  1991 - † M'Lady's Jewel / Richmond Boy 
  1990 - Bovader
  1989 - Ossie Pak
  1988 - Heron Bridge
  1987 - Track Jester
  1986 - Miss Symphony
  1985 - Jemoyn
  1984 - Heron Bridge

† Run in Divisions
‡ Note: 2 races in 1994 - January and December (Scheduling change for 1994–95 season)

See also

 List of Australian Group races
 Group races

References

Horse races in Australia
Sport in Perth, Western Australia